Karnataka State Department of Archaeology is a department of the Government of Karnataka which oversees archaeological exploration and maintenance of heritage sites in the state of Karnataka, India. Established in 1885, as the Archaeological Department of the princely state of Mysore, B. Lewis Rice was its first Director General. In the last years of the 19th century, the department published the inscriptions of Mysore as a multiple volume Epigraphia Carnatica. 

The most prominent archaeologist associated with the Karnataka State Department of Archaeology was M. S. Nagaraja Rao who later went on to head the Archaeological Survey of India (ASI).

See also 

 Tamil Nadu Archaeology Department
 Kerala State Archaeology Department

External links 

 

State archaeology departments of India
1885 establishments in India